The Interstate League was the name of five different American minor baseball leagues that played intermittently from 1896 through 1952.

Early leagues

Earlier versions of the Interstate League, with years active:
1896–1901: an unclassified loop with teams in Ohio, Indiana, Michigan, Kentucky, and West Virginia.
1905-08; 1914-16: a Class D league with clubs in Pennsylvania and New York.
1913: a Class C league operating in Ohio, Pennsylvania and West Virginia.
1932: a Class D circuit based in Pennsylvania and New Jersey.

In addition, a Class C level Interstate Association existed for one season, 1906, in Michigan, Indiana and Ohio.

1895 to 1900 Interstate League

Cities represented 1895 – 1900
 Akron, OH: Akron 1895 
 Anderson, IN: Anderson 1900 
 Canton, OH: Canton 1895 
 Columbus, OH: Columbus Buckeyes 1895, Columbus Senators 1899–1901 
 Dayton, OH: Dayton Old Soldiers 1897–1898, Dayton Soldiers 1899, Dayton Veterans 1900, Dayton Old Soldiers 1901 
 Findlay, OH: Findlay 1895 
 Fort Wayne, IN: Fort Wayne Farmers 1896, Fort Wayne Indians 1897–1900, Fort Wayne Railroaders 1901 
 Grand Rapids, MI: Grand Rapids Cabinet Makers 1898, Grand Rapids Furniture Makers 1899 
 Jackson, MI: Jackson Wolverines 1896 
 Kenton, OH: Kenton 1895 
 Lima, OH: Lima 1895 
 Mansfield, OH: Mansfield 1895, Mansfield Haymakers 1897–1900 
 Marion, IN: Marion Glass Blowers 1900 
 New Castle, PA: New Castle Quakers 1896–1900 
 Saginaw, MI: Saginaw Lumbermen 1896 
 Springfield, OH: Springfield Governors 1897–1898, Springfield Wanderers 1899 
 Steubenville, OH: Steubenville Stubs 1895 
 Toledo, OH: Toledo Swamp Angels 1896, Toledo Mud Hens 1896–1900 
 Dennison, OH & Uhrichsville, OH: Twin Cities Twins 1895 
 Washington, PA: Washington Little Senators 1896 
 Wheeling, WV: Wheeling Nailers 1895–1897, Wheeling Stogies 1899–1900 
 Youngstown, OH: Youngstown Puddlers 1896–1898, Youngstown Little Giants 1899–1900

Standings & statistics 1895 to 1900 
1895 Interstate League - schedule President: Howard H. Zeigler
  Canton disbanded June 2; Lima transferred to Mansfield May 5, Mansfield disbanded July 14; Steubenville transferred to Akron May 10; Akron transferred to Lima May 19, Lima disbanded July 15. The league disbanded July 15 
 
1896 Intestate League President: Charles B. Powers 
Ft. Wayne disbanded in early September Playoff: Toledo 4 games, Fort Wayne 0; won by forfeit since Fort Wayne has already disbanded 
 
1897 Interstate League President: Charles B. Powers
Playoff: Toledo 4 games, Dayton 2. 
 1898 Interstate League - schedule President: Charles B. Powers 
 No Playoffs Scheduled. 
 1899 Interstate League - schedule President: Charles B. Powers 
 Grand Rapids moved to Columbus July 20, then to Springfield July 30. No Playoffs were held.
 
1900 Interstate League President: Charles B. Powers 
 Columbus (51-63) moved to Anderson, Indiana, August 22; Youngstown (28-67) moved to Marion August 5. Playoff: Fort Wayne 4 games, Dayton 3.

1905 to 1908 Interstate League

Cities represented 1905 – 1908
 Bradford, PA: Bradford Drillers 1905–1908 
 Coudersport, PA: Coudersport Giants 1905 
 DuBois, PA: DuBois Miners 1905–1907 
 Erie, PA: Erie Fishermen 1905,1907–1908, Erie Sailors 1906 
 Franklin, PA: Franklin Millionaires 1907–1908 
 Hornell, NY: Hornell Pigmies 1906 
 Jamestown, NY: Jamestown Hill Climbers 1905 
 Kane, PA: Kane Mountaineers 1905–1907 
 Oil City, PA: Oil City Cubs 1907–1908 
 Oil City-Jamestown, PA/NY: Oil City-Jamestown Oseejays 1906 
 Olean, NY: Olean Refiners 1905–1907 ; Olean Candidates 1908 
 Patton, PA: Patton  1906 
 Punxsutawney, PA: Punxsutawney Policemen 1906–1907 
 Warren, PA: Warren Blues 1908

Standings & statistics 1905 to 1908
1905 Interstate League President: Frank Baumeister / George F. Rindernecht  
 Jamestown (18–23) Moved to DuBois July 12. No Playoffs Scheduled.
 
1906 Interstate League President: George F. Rindernecht 
 Hornell (35–31) moved to Patton August 6. No Playoffs Scheduled. No player statistics available. 
1907 Interstate Leagueschedule President: Frank Baumeister 
  Kane disbanded July 16; Olean disbanded July 18; Punxsutawney disbanded August 3; DuBois disbanded August 5. The league played a third season, August 7 through September 8, won by Bradford.Oil City was declared the first half champion because DuBois disbanded. Playoff: Oil City 4 games, Bradford 3. 
 
1908 Interstate League President: C.L. Rexford 
 The league disbanded June 5.

1913 Interstate League

Cities represented 1913 
Akron, OH: Akron Giants 1913 
Canton, OH: Canton Senators 1913 
Columbus, OH: Columbus Cubs 1913 
Erie, PA: Erie Sailors 1913 
Steubenville, OH: Steubenville Stubs 1913 
Wheeling, WV: Wheeling Stogies 1913 
Youngstown, OH: Youngstown Steelmen 1913 
Zanesville, OH: Zanesville Flood Sufferers 1913

Standings & statistics 1913  
1913 Interstate League schedule President: C.L. Rexford  
Zanesville disbanded July 13. The league disbanded July 21.

1914 to 1916 Interstate League

Cities represented 1914 – 1916 
 Bradford, PA: Bradford Drillers 1914–1916 
 Erie, PA: Erie Sailors 1916 
 Hornell, NY: Hornell Green Sox 1914, Hornell Maple Leafs 1915 
 Jamestown, NY: Jamestown Giants 1914, Jamestown Rabbits 1915 
 Johnsonburg, PA: Johnsonburg Johnnies 1916 
 Olean, NY: Olean Refiners 1914, Olean White Sox 1915–1916 
 Ridgway, PA: Ridgway 1916 
 St. Marys, PA: St. Marys Saints 1916 
 Warren, PA: Warren Bingoes 1914–1915, Warren Warriors (1916) 
 Wellsville, NY: Wellsville Rainmakers 1914–1916

Standings & statistics 1914-1916 
1914 Interstate League Presidents: Milton A. Jordan / W. Duke Jr. 
 Playoff: Jamestown 4 games, Bradford 3. No Individual Statistics Available. 
1915 Interstate League President: James A. Lindsey
 Jamestown disbanded August 14. Playoff: None; Olean refused to engage in a playoff, claiming that Jamestown's second half games should have been thrown out for failing to complete the schedule and Olean should have won both halves. The claim was denied and the title was awarded to Wellsville. 

1916 Interstate Leagueschedule President: James A. Lindsey 
 Olean disbanded July 12. Warren disbanded August 4; none of its second half games (6-9) were counted.Erie disbanded August 9. Games thrown out: Wins: Warren 6, Wellsville 3, Bradford 2, Erie 2, St. Marys 1, Johnsonburg 1; Losses: Warren 9, Wellsville 4, St. Marys 1.

1932 Interstate League

Cities represented 1932
 Lancaster, PA: Lancaster Red Sox 1932
 Norristown, PA: Norristown 1932 
 Pottstown, PA: Pottstown Legionaires 1932 
 Slatington, PA: Slatington Dukes 1932 
 St. Clair, PA: St. Clair Saints 1932
 Stroudsburg, PA: Stroudsburg Poconos 1932 
 Tamaqua, PA: Tamaqua Dukes 1932 
 Washington, NJ: Washington Potomacs 1932

Standings & statistics 1932 
1932 Interstate League President: William J. Willenbecher 
 Pottstown disbanded in June, reorganized and re-formed June 17; disbanded again causing the league to fold; Norristown (2-4) moved to St. Clair May 28, then disbanded June 12;  Tamaqua (8-12) moved to Slatington June 8; Lancaster disbanded June 17. The league disbanded June 20.

1939–1952

The longest tenured version of the Interstate League was the last incarnation, which played in the Middle Atlantic States from 1939 through 1952, and was one of the few mid-level minor leagues to operate continuously during the World War II period.

This circuit, which began as Class C and was upgraded to Class B in 1940, typically had teams in Allentown, Harrisburg, Lancaster and Sunbury, all in Pennsylvania; Hagerstown, Maryland; Trenton, New Jersey; and Wilmington, Delaware. Its final champion was the Hagerstown Braves, a Boston Braves affiliate. That season, the York White Roses led the league in attendance, attracting over 78,000 fans.

Cities/Teams/Years

League champions

Individual records

Hitting
Games: 142, Steve Flipowicz, Sunbury (1947)
Batting Average: .428, Woody Wheaton, Hazelton (1939)
At Bats: 593, Robert Mays, Hagerstown (1943)
Runs: 128, Nellie Fox, Lancaster (1945)  128, Richard Burgett, Allentown (1946)
Hits: 220, George Kell, Lancaster (1943)
Runs Batted In: 144, Edward Sanicki, Wilmington (1946)
Doubles: 52, Bob Maier, Hagerstown (1943)
Triples: 24, Harold Bamberger, Trenton (1947)  24, Charley Neal, Lancaster (1951)
Home Runs: 37, Edward Sanicki, Wilmington (1947)
Extra Base Hits: 73, John Capra, Allentown (1944)
Total Bases: 320, Del Ennis, Trenton (1943)
Consecutive Game Hitting Streak: 22, Harold Nerino, Sunbury (1940)  22, Bill Cox, Harrisburg (1941)  22, Edward Nowak, Hagerstown (1945)
Sacrifices: 24, Harvey Johnson, Harrisburg (1941)
Stolen Bases: 47, Joseph Schmidt, Wilmington (1946)
Walks: 130, Guy Glaser, Wilmington (1945)
Hit By Pitch: 23, Nellie Fox, Lancaster (1945)
Struck Out: 123, Peyton Rambin, Trenton (1949)

Pitching
Games: 49, George Eyrich, Wilmington (1948)
Complete Games: 29, Charles Bowles, Lancaster (1943)  29, Norman Shope, York (1944)
Wins: 24, Daniel Lewandowski, Allentown (1951)
Losses: 21, Wilson Emmerick, Allentown (1943)
Best Percentage: .880 (22-3), Anderson Bush, Hagerstown (1951)
Earned Run Average: 1.44, Royce Lint, Harrisburg (1942)
Innings Pitched: 260, Charles Miller, Hagerstown (1943)
Win Streak: 13, Woody Wheaton, Lancaster (1943)
Shutouts: 7, John Burrows, Wilmington (1942), 
Strikeouts: 278, Andy Tomasic, Trenton (1947)
Bases on Balls: 165, Dick Libby, Sunbury (1948)
Wild Pitches: 19, Joseph Slotter, Hagerstown (1944)

No-hitters

References

Further reading
Johnson, Lloyd and Wolff, Miles, editors: Encyclopedia of Minor League Baseball. Durham, North Carolina Publisher: Baseball America, 2007. Format: Hardback, 767 pp. 

Interstate League
Baseball leagues in Delaware
Baseball leagues in Pennsylvania
Baseball leagues in New Jersey
Baseball leagues in Maryland
Baseball leagues in Connecticut